Narrow Island is one of the Falkland Islands, in Byron Sound. It is between Golding Island and Middle Island, and to the west of East Island. As its name implies, it is slender, and extends for several miles east–west, while only being about 500 yards in width at is widest point.

References

Islands of the Falkland Islands